Multimedia Entertainment, Inc. (formerly Avco Program Sales) was an American television production/distribution company originally formed in 1968.

History
The firm was launched as Avco Program Sales in 1968 as a television production/distribution company owned by the Cincinnati-based Avco Corporation. Another company called Avco Embassy Television (which was sold to Norman Lear and Jerry Perenchio in 1982 and folded into Embassy Telecommunications) was originally responsible for television distribution of the Embassy Pictures film library. In addition, Avco Program Sales concentrated on its own in-house productions. One of its first programs was The Phil Donahue Show in 1970.

In 1976, Multimedia, Inc., a Greenville, South Carolina-based newspaper publisher and broadcaster, purchased the production and syndication rights to The Phil Donahue Show and the regionally distributed Bob Braun Show from Avco, which was breaking up its media interests. Multimedia also acquired WLWT in Cincinnati, Avco's flagship station, and initially based its syndication division there. For the next two decades Multimedia Entertainment specialized in audience-participation daytime talk shows with Donahue as its flagship program.

In 1981, Multimedia acquired Show Biz Inc., syndicator of country music television programs such as Pop! Goes the Country. Multimedia also received an agreement with Jim Owens Productions to distribute country-based programs. The company later used Multimedia's St. Louis flagship station KSDK as launching pad for The Sally Jessy Raphael Show in 1983, and WLWT as the original base for The Jerry Springer Show in 1991. Multimedia Entertainment also created short-lived TV vehicles for conservative talk radio hosts Rush Limbaugh and Dennis Prager. During this period, Bob Turner, New York Congressman, served as the company's CEO.

On September 17, 1991, Multimedia acquired assets of Carolco's television distribution unit Orbis Communications. Included were first-run syndication rights to The Joker's Wild and John Davidson's hosted version of The $100,000 Pyramid and TV movies. The Carolco Television Productions unit has been became Multimedia Television Productions, which was later known as Multimedia Motion Pictures, and Robert Turner has joined the studio as president. Neil Russell was then served as president of the studio several months later.

Multimedia Entertainment was included in the sale of Multimedia to the Gannett Company in 1995. Gannett then sold its production/syndication arm to Universal Television in 1996 and a year later it was folded into Universal Television Enterprises in February. In 1998, Universal Television including the USA Networks were sold to Barry Diller and became part of Studios USA.

The rights to the Multimedia Entertainment name were retained by Gannett, and were transferred to Tegna after Gannett split into two companies in 2015; it is now used for the Tegna subsidiary that holds the license for WGRZ in Buffalo, New York (which Gannett had acquired in a swap for WLWT in 1997, shortly after the Multimedia acquisition), while KARE, KPNX, KUSA, KTVD, WTLV, and WJXX operate as Multimedia Holdings Corporation.

Tegna, Multimedia's successor, re-entered the syndication business in 2017 with the series Daily Blast Live and Sister Circle.

Syndicated programs
This is a listing of programs which were either produced or distributed by Multimedia Entertainment:

 Almost Live! (late 1990s)
 Crook & Chase (1996-1997)
 The Pat Bullard Show (1996-1997)
 The Phil Donahue Show / Donahue (1970–1996)
 Rush Limbaugh: The Television Show (1992–1996)
 The Dennis Prager Show (1994–1995)
 The Sally Jessy Raphael Show / Sally (1983–1997)
 Big Break (1990-1991)
 The Jerry Springer Show (1991–1997)
 Sweethearts (1988–1989)
 The $100,000 Pyramid (1991, season 2)
 Young People's Specials (1984–1985)
FilmsMurder Between Friends'' (filmed 1993, first broadcast January 10, 1994)

See also
 Avco
 Crosley Broadcasting Corporation (later Avco Broadcasting Corporation)

References

External links
Avco Embassy Television
Multimedia Entertainment

Television production companies of the United States
Defunct film and television production companies of the United States
Entertainment companies established in 1968
Mass media companies established in 1968
Mass media companies disestablished in 1997
Universal Television
Former Gannett subsidiaries
American companies established in 1968
American companies disestablished in 1997